Elnardo Julian Webster II (born December 23, 1969) is a former American football linebacker who played one season with the Pittsburgh Steelers of the National Football League (NFL). He was drafted by the Steelers in the ninth round of the 1992 NFL Draft. He played college football at Rutgers University and attended St. Peter's Preparatory School in Jersey City, New Jersey.

College career
Webster lettered for the Rutgers Scarlet Knights from 1988 to 1991. He earned Honorable Mention All-Big East honors in 1990 and First-team All-Big East accolades in 1991.

Professional career
Webster was selected by the Pittsburgh Steelers with the 235th pick in the 1992 NFL Draft. He played in three games for the Steelers during the 1992 season. He was placed on injured reserve with a knee injury on September 22, 1992. Webster was released by the Steelers on August 24, 1993.

Personal life
Webster earned his BA, MBA and JD degrees from Rutgers University and works as a lawyer in East Orange, New Jersey.

He is the son of former professional basketball player Elnardo Webster Sr.

References

External links
Just Sports Stats

Living people
1969 births
Players of American football from Jersey City, New Jersey
American football linebackers
African-American players of American football
Rutgers Scarlet Knights football players
Pittsburgh Steelers players
People from Gorizia
20th-century American lawyers
21st-century American lawyers
African-American lawyers
New Jersey lawyers
St. Peter's Preparatory School alumni
20th-century African-American sportspeople
21st-century African-American people
Sportspeople from Friuli-Venezia Giulia